Brian Donovan may refer to:

 Brian Donovan (actor), American voice actor
 Brian Donovan (journalist) (died 2018), American journalist